KOD, K.O.D., KoD, Kod or Köd may refer to

Music
Kitchens of Distinction, an English alternative rock band
K.O.D., an album by Tech N9ne 
KOD (album), a 2018 album by J. Cole
"KOD" (song), from the album

Other uses
Knockout (KO'd) 
Committee for the Defence of Democracy (Polish: Komitet Obrony Demokracji)
King of Donair, a Canadian restaurant chain
Kiss-o'-Death (KoD) packets, a technical solution to NTP server misuse and abuse
Köd, a village in Năpradea, Romania